Ivor Owen Thomas (5 December 1898 – 11 January 1982) was a British trade unionist and Labour Party politician.

Thomas was the son of Benjamin L. Thomas from Briton Ferry in South Wales.
He was educated at Vernon Place School in Briton Ferry. He was employed as a barber's lather boy, and then at Gwalia Tinplate Works from 1912 to 1918, when he was called up for WW1 military service. As a conscientious objector, he refused, and spent a year in prison. Thomas was an engine cleaner on the Great Western Railway from 1919 to 1923. He won a scholarship to the Central Labour College in London, where he studied from 1923 to 1925, then worked at the head office of the National Union of Railwaymen until 1945.

Thomas was a Labour Party councillor on Battersea Metropolitan Borough Council from 1928 or 1929 to 1945. At the 1945 general election he was elected as the Member of Parliament (MP) for The Wrekin in Shropshire.
He was re-elected in 1950 and 1951, holding the seat until defeat, by 478 votes, at the 1955 general election in favour of the Conservative William Yates.

He then returned to work at the NUR headquarters until 1958, and worked for British Rail at London Waterloo station from 1960 to 1965.

There is a road named after him in the village of St Georges, situated in Telford (formerly the Wrekin constituency). (Ivor Thomas Road,
St George's, Telford, TF2 9EZ, q.v., Google Maps)

Personal life 
In 1929, Thomas married Beatrice Davis, daughter of William Davis. They had one daughter.

Beatrice died in 1978, and Thomas died in 1982, aged 83.

References

External links 
 

1898 births
1982 deaths
People from Briton Ferry
Labour Party (UK) MPs for English constituencies
Members of the Fabian Society
Members of the Parliament of the United Kingdom for constituencies in Shropshire
National Union of Railwaymen-sponsored MPs
UK MPs 1945–1950
UK MPs 1950–1951
UK MPs 1951–1955
Members of Battersea Metropolitan Borough Council
Labour Party (UK) councillors
British trade unionists
British conscientious objectors
Great Western Railway people